Elections to Limavady Borough Council were held on 18 May 1977 on the same day as the other Northern Irish local government elections. The election used three district electoral areas to elect a total of 15 councillors.

Election results

Note: "Votes" are the first preference votes.

Districts summary

|- class="unsortable" align="centre"
!rowspan=2 align="left"|Ward
! % 
!Cllrs
! % 
!Cllrs
! %
!Cllrs
! %
!Cllrs
!rowspan=2|TotalCllrs
|- class="unsortable" align="center"
!colspan=2 bgcolor="" | UUP
!colspan=2 bgcolor="" | SDLP
!colspan=2 bgcolor="" | DUP
!colspan=2 bgcolor="white"| Others
|-
|align="left"|Area A
|33.0
|2
|bgcolor="#99FF66"|43.1
|bgcolor="#99FF66"|3
|13.0
|1
|10.9
|0
|6
|-
|align="left"|Area B
|bgcolor="40BFF5"|34.4
|bgcolor="40BFF5"|2
|33.0
|2
|12.4
|0
|20.2
|1
|5
|-
|align="left"|Area C
|bgcolor="40BFF5"|48.1
|bgcolor="40BFF5"|2
|23.0
|1
|15.7
|1
|13.2
|0
|4
|-
|- class="unsortable" class="sortbottom" style="background:#C9C9C9"
|align="left"| Total
|38.6
|6
|33.2
|6
|13.8
|2
|14.4
|1
|15
|-
|}

Districts results

Area A

1973: 3 x United Unionist, 2 x SDLP, 1 x Alliance
1977: 3 x SDLP, 2 x UUP, 1 x DUP
1973-1977 Change: UUP (two seats), DUP and SDLP gain from United Unionist (three seats) and Alliance

Area B

1973: 2 x United Unionist, 2 x SDLP, 1 x Independent
1977: 2 x UUP, 2 x SDLP, 1 x Independent
1973-1977 Change: UUP (two seats) gain from United Unionist

Area C

1973: 3 x United Unionist, 1 x Alliance
1977: 2 x UUP, 1 x SDLP, 1 x DUP
1973-1977 Change: UUP (two seats), SDLP and DUP gain from United Unionist (three seats) and Alliance

References

Limavady Borough Council elections
Limavady